Kushtovë or Košutovo is a village in Leposavić, northern Kosovo. It is inhabited by an ethnic Albanian majority. It is part of the region known as Shala e Bajgorës.

Notes

Villages in Leposavić